Qualification for tennis at the 2008 Summer Olympics in Beijing, China was determined not by any form of qualifying tournament, but by the rankings maintained by the Association of Tennis Professionals (ATP) and the Women's Tennis Association (WTA).

Qualifying criteria
The main qualifying criteria were the ATP and WTA ranking lists as of June 9, 2008. The players entering were formally submitted by the International Tennis Federation (ITF). The ATP and WTA rankings were based on performances from the previous 52 weeks, and there were several tournaments, including the 2008 Wimbledon Championships, in the two-month period between the time of the rankings being frozen for entry, and the beginning of the tennis events at the Olympics. This led one player, Rainer Schüttler, who rose the ATP rankings considerably in that time period, to successfully seek arbitration on the matter and gain entry. Another player, Tamarine Tanasugarn who was outside the ranking places that could qualify on July 9, but re-entered them, like Schuettler, gained entry; although she did so through the Tripartite Commission Invitation places after Stephanie Vogt withdrew.

Each National Olympic Committee (NOC) could enter 6 men and 6 women athletes, with a maximum of 4 entries in the individual events, and 2 pairs in the doubles events. This resulted in several high-ranked players being unable to enter, despite players of lower-rank being able to. For example, Vera Zvonareva, world number 13, would not have been entered had all the Russian players ahead of her done so, and world number 21, Nadia Petrova, was unable to participate (the top four Russian women players were all in the world's top eight). In the men's, a notably high-ranked player who could not gain entry was world number 20 Fernando Verdasco of Spain. However, any player in the world's top 56 was eligible, and NOC's had the option to enter players of a lower rank. Athletes were able to compete in both single and doubles events.

Singles:
 56 players directly qualified for the singles event based on the recognised World Ranking of 9 June 2008. Any player qualified for the singles event was automatically eligible for entry in the doubles event.
 2 Invitation places in each singles event were allocated by the Tripartite Commission.
 6 final qualification places in the singles event were allocated by the ITF based on the recognised World Ranking and the continental/NOC representation.

Doubles:
 10 players directly qualified for the doubles event based on the recognised World Ranking of 9 June 2008.
 Final qualification places were allocated by the ITF to doubles players based on the recognised World Ranking and the continental/NOC representation, until a total of 86 places have been allocated.

The ITF places were allocated by the ITF, based on recognized world ranking and continental/NOC participation.

Summary
A total of 48 nations were represented by at least one player in either the men's singles, women's singles, men's doubles, or women's doubles.

Number in brackets = players participating only in doubles

Qualifiers

Men's singles

PR Protected/Special Ranking

Rankings as at 9 June 2008

Schüttler entry controversy
On August 4, 2008, German player Rainer Schüttler was granted an exceptional entry into the tournament, despite not having qualified under the original criteria, after having taken his campaign to play at the games to the Court of Arbitration for Sport (CAS). Schuettler, who was an alternate for Denis Gremelmayr, was ranked outside the qualifying places on June 9, when the players entered for the Games, based upon the ATP rankings of that date, were announced by the ITF. Schüttler then went on to the 2008 Wimbledon Championships, where he reached the semi-finals, elevating his ranking from No. 94 to No. 31 in the world. Germany had received one place in the men's singles, based upon the rankings of June 9, although several players withdrew before the Games. Schüttler was subsequently selected by the German Olympic Committee (Deutscher Olympischer Sportbund, DOS), in spite of the regulations set out by the International Tennis Federation (ITF), under which he was designated as an alternate. On August 3, Schüttler took his case to CAS, who the next day ruled in his favour, saying that it was in compliance with the ITF's rules, and asserting that there was an understanding that the decision over which player could be entered would be delegated to the relevant National Olympic Committee. The ITF delivered a hostile response to the decision by CAS, claiming the DOS was ignorant, and admonishing Schüttler's actions — "While recognising the German NOC may not understand how professional tennis works, there is no excuse for Mr Schuettler, who is prepared to take a place earned by his compatriot Denis Gremelmayr and of next alternate Michael Berrer."

Women's singles

PR Protected/Special Rankings

Rankings as at 9 June 2008

Men's doubles

^ Players have also qualified to the singles tournament

Women's doubles

^ Players have also qualified to the singles tournament

References
ITF announces direct acceptance list

Qualification for the 2008 Summer Olympics
Tennis at the 2008 Summer Olympics
Qualification for tennis tournaments